Bixad may refer to several places in Romania:

 Bixad, Covasna, a commune in Covasna County
 Bixad, Satu Mare, a commune in Satu Mare County